The 2007–08 season was Dunfermline Athletic's first season in the Scottish First Division, having been relegated from the Scottish Premier League at the end of the 2006–07 season. Dunfermline Athletic also competed in the Challenge Cup, League Cup,  Scottish Cup and the UEFA Cup.

Review and Events
Dunfermline Athletic's first season after relegation from the Scottish Premier League started with disappointment. One win in seven games left them languishing in second last place and even more pressure was put on manager Stephen Kenny after they were knocked out of the UEFA Cup in the knockout qualifying round by Swedish minnows BK Häcken. Despite this the team managed to get to the final of the Scottish Challenge Cup, where they played against St Johnstone but lost 3–2.

At the start of December, Stephen Kenny was sacked as manager of Dunfermline after just over a year in charge. Jim McIntyre was immediately given the role of caretaker manager and after a successful run in which he won four out of six games, he was appointed as Dunfermline manager on a full-time basis on 3 January 2008. He signed a two-and-a-half-year deal. McIntyre started his reign by allowing 6 members of his squad to leave to try to cut the squad size down. McIntyre's changes to the squad seemed to have a positive effect as the Pars eventually finished 5th overall, beating Queen of the South by 4 goals on the final day of the season.

Chronological list of events
This is a list of the significant events to occur at the club during the 2007–08 season, presented in chronological order. This list does not include transfers, which are listed in the transfers section below, or match results, which are in the results section.

 4 August: Pre-season favourites Dunfermline get off to the worst possible start to the season, losing 2–1 to Hamilton Academical
 8 August: Played a testimonial match for Scott Thomson against Manchester United, losing 4–0 with Wayne Rooney scoring two of United's goals.
 4 December: After a disappointing start to the season, manager Stephen Kenny was sacked with the Pars in second bottom of the First Division. Striker Jim McIntyre was made caretaker manager.
 3 January: Jim McIntyre was appointed manager of Dunfermline full-time after notching up four wins and two draws as caretaker of the club.
 11 January: Jim McIntyre picks up the First Division Manager of the Month award for December.
 31 January: New manager Jim McIntyre has a major clear out at the club in the January transfer window, getting rid of four players on deadline day.
 1 February: Stirling Midfielder Steven Bell signs a pre-contract agreement with Dunfermline to become Jim McIntyre's first signing.
 18 April: Manager Jim McIntyre announces that both Mark Burchill and Stephen Simmons have rejected new contracts, while Scott Thomson signed a new one-year deal.
 26 April: The final game of the season sees Dunfermline demolish Queen of the South 4–0, leaving the Pars final position being 5th.

League table

Results & fixtures

Friendlies

Pre-season

Mid-season

Scottish First Division

Scottish Challenge Cup

Scottish League Cup

Scottish Cup

UEFA Cup

Fife Cup

Player statistics

Squad
Last updated 25 June 2015

|-
|colspan="14"|Players who appeared for Dunfermline Athletic but left during the season:

|}

Goalscorers

Transfers

Players in

Players out

Loan in

Loans out

References

External links
 Official Site: 2007–08 fixtures
 BBC Sport – Club Stats
 Soccerbase – Results | Squad stats | Transfers

Dunfermline Athletic
Dunfermline Athletic F.C. seasons